Archips limatus is a species of moth of the family Tortricidae. It is found in Shanxi, China.

Subspecies
Archips limatus limatus
Archips limatus albatus Razowski, 1977

References

Moths described in 1977
Archips
Moths of Asia